Here Are the Young Moderns, released on January 9, 1998, was Kill Hannah's debut album under their current name, and has been out of print for some time.

Track listing
 "Stunt Pilots" – 3:48
 "Hyperactive" – 4:35
 "Get Famous" – 5:27
 "Nerve Gas" – 3:47
 "Hummingbirds the Size of Bullets" – 3:42
 "Love Sick" – 3:50
 "Sleeping Like Electric Eels" – 2:50
 "Kill Hannah" – 4:04
 "Chloroform (Slow Reaction)" – 11:07 (5:32)
"Toy Soldier (For Never and Ever)" at 6:58 to 11:07 (hidden track)

Tracks 1, 3, and 9 were recorded/produced by Garrett Hammond, Chicago.
Tracks 4 and 6 were recorded by Don Bodin at Studio Underwater, Chicago.
Tracks 5, 7, and 8 were recorded by Chad Steinhardt at Trackwork Orange Studios.
Track 7 was produced by Mike Thrasher and Matt Westfield.

Recording band
James Connelly – drums
Greg Corner – bass
Matthew Devine – guitars, vocals
Kerry Finerty – guitars, vocals

References

1998 albums